Chen Lin (31 January 1970 – 31 October 2009) was a Chinese Mandopop singer. She committed suicide at the age of 39.

Career
She rose to stardom with her 1993 album entitled I Can Never Understand Your Love (in Mandarin 你的柔情我永远不懂). It reached the top of the Chinese album charts, selling 1.5 million copies. She ended up releasing 7 albums.

Personal life
In 1995, she married the singer Shen Yongge, founder of Zhu Shu Entertainment Ltd., a record company. He  helped her with releasing three albums that defined the peak of her career in 2000. Shen and Chen were a popular celebrity couple until divorcing in 2007. Her second marriage was to singer and producer Zhang Chaofeng in July 2009, and soon after in August 2009 Chen Lin released her last EP. Friends said she was plagued with emotional problems leading up to her suicide in October 2009.

Death
Three months after her second marriage, she committed suicide on 31 October 2009 by jumping from an apartment building in the Olympic Garden community in Chaoyang District, in Beijing. It was reported that some of Chen's friends said the singer was traumatized about the failure of her first marriage to Shen Yongge and picked his birthday to commit suicide.

Discography

Albums
(approximate translations of titles in parenthesis)
 你的柔情我永远不懂 (I can never understand your love) (1993)
 害怕爱上你  (Afraid of falling in Love with you) (1996)
 女人 (Woman) (1997)
 陈琳 (Chen Lin) (2000)
 爱就爱了 Love is Love (2001)
 不想骗自己 (Don't want to lie to myself) (2003)
 13131 (2005)

Singles
(Selective list. Approximate translations of titles in parenthesis)
你的柔情我永远不懂 ("I can never understand your love")
害怕爱上你 "Afraid to Fall in Love with You")
两个人的世界 ("The World of Two People")
雨夜 ("Rainy Night")
十二种颜色 ("Twelve Colors")
不想骗自己 ("Don't want to lie to myself")
爱就爱了 ("Love Is Love")
抱紧我别走 ("Hold Me Close and Don't Go")
天使的选择 ("Angel's Choice")
当爱已错时 ("When Love Is Wrong")

References

 
|-
! colspan="3" style="background: #DAA520;" | Top Chinese Music Chart Awards
|-

1970 births
2009 suicides
Chinese Mandopop singers
Singers from Chongqing
Suicides by jumping in China
Suicides in the People's Republic of China
20th-century Chinese women singers
21st-century Chinese women singers